The Battle of Sondani was a large military encounter fought in 528 CE, between the Alchon Hun emperor Mihirakula and a confederation of Indian rulers led by king Yashodharman of Malwa.

Background
The Alchon Huns under their able leader Toramana invaded the mainland of the Indian subcontinent. The Huns extensively weakened the Gupta Empire by their devastating raids. Toramana was finally vanquished with certainty by an Indian ruler of the Aulikara dynasty of Malwa, after nearly 20 years in India. According to the Rīsthal stone-slab inscription, discovered in 1983, King Prakashadharma defeated Toramana in 515 CE.  The First Hunnic War thus ended with a Hunnic defeat, and Hunnic troops apparently retreated to the area of Punjab.

Mihirakula, the eldest son and successor of Toramana, again invaded India. He was even crueler and caused more destruction than his predecessor. Yashodharman, the ruler of Malwa and the son of King Prakashadharma, created an alliance with the other Indian rulers to defeat the Huns.

Result
A confederacy of Indian rulers led by Yashodharman, and possibly even supported by the Gupta emperor Narasimhagupta, decisively defeated the Hunnic armies at Sondani in 528 CE. 

This resulted in the loss of Alchon possessions in the Punjab and north India by 542. The Sondani inscription in Sondani, near Mandsaur, records the submission by the Hunas, and claims that Yasodharman had rescued the earth from rude and cruel kings, and that he "had bent the head of Mihirakula". In a part of the Sondani inscription Yasodharman thus praises himself for having defeated king Mihirakula:

The Gupta Empire emperor Narasimhagupta is also credited in helping repulse Mihirakula, after the latter had conquered most of India, according to the reports of Chinese monk Xuanzang. 

In a fanciful account, Xuanzang, who wrote a century later in 630 CE, reported that Mihirakula had conquered all India except for an island where the king of Magadha named Baladitya (who could be Gupta ruler Narasimhagupta Baladitya) took refuge, but that was finally captured by the Indian king. He later spared Mihirakula's life on the intercession of his mother, as she perceived the Hun ruler "as a man of remarkable beauty and vast wisdom". Mihirakula is then said to have returned to Kashmir to retake the throne.

Aftermath

After the war was over, Yashodharman conquered vast territories and established a short-lived empire.

In the Mandsaur pillar inscription, Yashodharman claims he vanquished his enemies and now controls the territory  from the neighbourhood of the (river) Lauhitya (Brahmaputra River) to the "Western Ocean" (Western Indian Ocean), and from the Himalayas to mountain Mahendra.

Yashodharman thus conquered vast territories from the Hunas and the Guptas, although his short-lived empire would ultimately disintegrate between c. 530-540 CE.

References

Malwa